ʻAbdu'l-Bahá (Persian: ‎, 23 May 1844 – 28 November 1921), born ʻAbbás, was the eldest son of Baháʼu'lláh and served as head of the Baháʼí Faith from 1892 until 1921. ʻAbdu'l-Bahá was later canonized as the last of three "central figures" of the religion, along with Baháʼu'lláh and the Báb, and his writings and authenticated talks are regarded as sources of Baháʼí sacred literature.

He was born in Tehran to an aristocratic family. At the age of eight his father was imprisoned during a government crackdown on the Bábí Faith and the family's possessions were looted, leaving them in virtual poverty. His father was exiled from their native Iran, and the family went to live in Baghdad, where they stayed for nine years. They were later called by the Ottoman state to Istanbul before going into another period of confinement in Edirne and finally the prison-city of ʻAkká (Acre). ʻAbdu'l-Bahá remained a political prisoner there until the Young Turk Revolution freed him in 1908 at the age of 64. He then made several journeys to the West to spread the Baháʼí message beyond its middle-eastern roots, but the onset of World War I left him largely confined to Haifa from 1914 to 1918. The war replaced the openly hostile Ottoman authorities with the British Mandate, who appointed him a Knight Commander of the Order of the British Empire for his help in averting famine following the war.

In 1892, ʻAbdu'l-Bahá was appointed in his father's will to be his successor and head of the Baháʼí Faith. He faced opposition from virtually all his family members, but held the loyalty of the great majority of Baháʼís around the world. His Tablets of the Divine Plan helped galvanize Baháʼís in North America into spreading the Baháʼí teachings to new territories, and his Will and Testament laid the foundation for the current Baháʼí administrative order. Many of his writings, prayers and letters are extant, and his discourses with the Western Baháʼís emphasize the growth of the religion by the late 1890s.

ʻAbdu'l-Bahá's given name was ʻAbbás. Depending on context, he would have gone by either Mírzá ʻAbbás (Persian) or ʻAbbás Effendi (Turkish), both of which are equivalent to the English Sir ʻAbbás. He preferred the title of ʻAbdu'l-Bahá ("servant of Bahá", a reference to his father). He is commonly referred to in Baháʼí texts as "The Master".

Early life

ʻAbdu'l-Bahá was born in Tehran, Persia (now Iran) on 23 May 1844 (5th of Jamadiyu'l-Avval, 1260 AH), the eldest son of Baháʼu'lláh and Navváb. He was born on the very same night on which the Báb declared his mission. Born with the given name of ʻAbbás, he was named after his grandfather Mírzá ʻAbbás Núrí, a prominent and powerful nobleman. As a child, ʻAbdu'l-Bahá was shaped by his father's position as a prominent Bábí. He recalled how he met the Bábí Táhirih and how she would take "me on to her knee, caress me, and talk to me. I admired her most deeply". ʻAbdu'l-Bahá had a happy and carefree childhood. The family's Tehran home and country houses were comfortable and beautifully decorated. ʻAbdu'l-Bahá enjoyed playing in the gardens with his younger sister with whom he was very close. Along with his younger siblings – a sister, Bahíyyih, and a brother, Mihdí – the three lived in an environment of privilege, happiness and comfort.  During his young childhood ʻAbdu'l-Bahá witnessed his parents' various charitable endeavours, which included converting part of the home to a hospital ward for women and children.

With most of his life was spent in exile and prison, there was little chance for normal schooling. Even when younger, it was customary not to send children of nobility to schools. Most noblemen were educated at home briefly in scripture, rhetoric, calligraphy and basic mathematics. Many were educated to prepare themselves for life in the royal court. Despite a brief spell at a traditional preparatory school at the age of seven for one year, ʻAbdu'l-Bahá received no formal education. As he grew he was educated by his mother, and uncle. Most of his education however, came from his father. Years later in 1890 Edward Granville Browne described how ʻAbdu'l-Bahá was "one more eloquent of speech, more ready of argument, more apt of illustration, more intimately acquainted with the sacred books of the Jews, the Christians, and the Muhammadans...scarcely be found even amongst the eloquent."

According to contemporary accounts, ʻAbdu'l-Bahá was an eloquent and charming child. When ʻAbdu'l-Bahá was seven, he contracted tuberculosis and was expected to die. Though the malady faded away, he would be plagued with bouts of illness for the rest of his life.

One event that affected ʻAbdu'l-Bahá greatly during his childhood was the imprisonment of his father when ʻAbdu'l-Bahá was eight years old; the imprisonment led to his family being reduced to poverty and being attacked in the streets by other children. ʻAbdu'l-Bahá accompanied his mother to visit Baháʼu'lláh who was then imprisoned in the infamous subterranean dungeon the Síyáh-Chál. He described how "I saw a dark, steep place. We entered a small, narrow doorway, and went down two steps, but beyond those one could see nothing. In the middle of the stairway, all of a sudden we heard His [Baháʼu'lláh's]…voice: 'Do not bring him in here', and so they took me back".

Baghdad 

Baháʼu'lláh was eventually released from prison, but ordered into exile, and ʻAbdu'l-Bahá, then eight years old, joined his father on the journey to Baghdad in the winter (January to April) of 1853. During the journey ʻAbdu'l-Bahá suffered from frost-bite. After a year of difficulties Baháʼu'lláh absented himself rather than continue to face the conflict with Mirza Yahya and secretly secluded himself in the mountains of Sulaymaniyah in April 1854 a month before ʻAbdu'l-Bahá's tenth birthday. Mutual sorrow resulted in him, his mother and sister becoming constant companions. ʻAbdu'l-Bahá was particularly close to both, and his mother took active participation in his education and upbringing. During the two-year absence of his father ʻAbdu'l-Bahá took up the duty of managing the affairs of the family, before his age of maturity (14 in middle-eastern society) and was known to be occupied with reading and, at a time of hand-copied scriptures being the primary means of publishing, was also engaged in copying the writings of the Báb. ʻAbdu'l-Bahá also took an interest in the art of horse riding and, as he grew, became a renowned rider.

In 1856, news of an ascetic carrying on discourses with local Súfí leaders that seemed to possibly be Baháʼu'lláh reached the family and friends. Immediately, family members and friends went to search for the elusive dervish – and in March brought Baháʼu'lláh back to Baghdad. On seeing his father, ʻAbdu'l-Bahá fell to his knees and wept loudly "Why did you leave us?", and this followed with his mother and sister doing the same. ʻAbdu'l-Bahá soon became his father's secretary and shield. During the sojourn in the city ʻAbdu'l-Bahá grew from a boy into a young man. He was noted as a "remarkably fine looking youth", and remembered for his charity. Having passed the age of maturity ʻAbdu'l-Bahá was regularly seen in the mosques of Baghdad discussing religious topics and the scripture as a young man. Whilst in Baghdad, ʻAbdu'l-Bahá composed a commentary at the request of his father on the Muslim tradition of "I was a Hidden Treasure" for a Súfí leader named ʻAlí Shawkat Páshá. ʻAbdu'l-Bahá was fifteen or sixteen at the time and ʻAlí Shawkat Páshá regarded the more than 11,000-word essay as a remarkable feat for somebody of his age. In 1863, in what became known as the Garden of Ridván, his father Baháʼu'lláh announced to a few that he was the manifestation of God and He whom God shall make manifest whose coming had been foretold by the Báb. On day eight of the twelve days, it is believed ʻAbdu'l-Bahá was the first person Baháʼu'lláh revealed his claim to.

Istanbul/Adrianople 

In 1863, Baháʼu'lláh was summoned to Istanbul, and thus his family, including ʻAbdu'l-Bahá, then eighteen, accompanied him on his 110-day journey. The journey to Constantinople was another wearisome journey, and ʻAbdu'l-Bahá helped feed the exiles. It was here that his position became more prominent amongst the Baháʼís. This was further solidified by Baháʼu'lláh's tablet of the Branch in which he constantly exalts his son's virtues and station. The family were soon exiled to Adrianople and ʻAbdu'l-Bahá went with the family. ʻAbdu'l-Bahá again suffered from frostbite.

In Adrianople ʻAbdu'l-Bahá was regarded as the sole comforter of his family – in particular to his mother. At this point ʻAbdu'l-Bahá was known by the Baháʼís as "the Master", and by non-Baháʼís as ʻAbbás Effendi ("Effendi" signifies "Sir"). It was in Adrianople that Baháʼu'lláh referred to his son as "the Mystery of God". The title of "Mystery of God" symbolises, according to Baháʼís, that ʻAbdu'l-Bahá is not a manifestation of God but how a "person of ʻAbdu'l-Bahá the incompatible characteristics of a human nature and superhuman knowledge and perfection have been blended and are completely harmonized". Baháʼu'lláh gave his son many other titles such as G͟husn-i-Aʻzam (meaning "Mightiest Branch" or "Mightier Branch"), the "Branch of Holiness", "the Center of the Covenant" and the apple of his eye. ʻAbdu'l-Bahá ("the Master") was devastated when hearing the news that he and his family were to be exiled separately from Baháʼu'lláh. It was, according to Baháʼís, through his intercession that the idea was reverted and the family were allowed to be exiled together.

ʻAkká 

At the age of 24, ʻAbdu'l-Bahá was clearly chief-steward to his father and an outstanding member of the Baháʼí community. Baháʼu'lláh and his family were – in 1868 – exiled to the penal colony of Acre, Palestine where it was expected that the family would perish. Arrival in ʻAkká was distressing for the family and exiles. They were greeted in a hostile manner by the surrounding population and his sister and father fell dangerously ill. When told that the women were to sit on the shoulders of the men to reach the shore, ʻAbdu'l-Bahá took a chair and carried the women to the bay of ʻAkká. ʻAbdu'l-Bahá was able to procure some anesthetic and nursed the sick. The Baháʼís were imprisoned under horrendous conditions in a cluster of cells covered in excrement and dirt. ʻAbdu'l-Bahá himself fell dangerously ill with dysentery, however a sympathetic soldier permitted a physician to help cure him. The population shunned them, the soldiers treated them the same, and the behaviour of Siyyid Muhammad-i-Isfahani (an Azali) did not help matters. Morale was further destroyed with the accidental death of ʻAbdu'l-Bahá's youngest brother Mírzá Mihdí at the age of 22. The grieving ʻAbdu'l-Bahá kept a night-long vigil beside his brother's body.

Later in ʻAkká 

Over time, he gradually took over responsibility for the relationships between the small Baháʼí exile community and the outside world. It was through his interaction with the people of ʻAkká (Acre) that, according to the Baháʼís, they recognized the innocence of the Baháʼís, and thus the conditions of imprisonment were eased. Four months after the death of Mihdí the family moved from the prison to the House of ʻAbbúd. The people of ʻAkká started to respect the Baháʼís and in particular, ʻAbdu'l-Bahá. ʻAbdu'l-Bahá was able to arrange for houses to be rented for the family, the family later moved to the Mansion of Bahjí around 1879 when an epidemic caused the inhabitants to flee.

ʻAbdu'l-Bahá soon became very popular in the penal colony and Myron Henry Phelps a wealthy New York lawyer described how "a crowd of human beings...Syrians, Arabs, Ethiopians, and many others", all waited to talk and receive ʻAbdu'l-Bahá. He undertook a history of the Bábí religion through publication of A Traveller's Narrative (Makála-i-Shakhsí Sayyáh) in 1886, later translated and published in translation in 1891 through Cambridge University by the agency of Edward Granville Browne.

Marriage and family life

When ʻAbdu'l-Bahá was a young man, speculation was rife amongst the Baháʼís to whom he would marry. Several young girls were seen as marriage prospects but ʻAbdu'l-Bahá seemed disinclined to marriage. On 8 March 1873, at the urging of his father, the twenty-eight-year-old ʻAbdu'l-Bahá married Fátimih Nahrí of Isfahán (1847–1938) a twenty-five-year-old from an upper-class family of the city. Her father was Mírzá Muḥammad ʻAlí Nahrí of Isfahan an eminent Baháʼí with prominent connections. Fátimih was brought from Persia to ʻAkká after both Baháʼu'lláh and his wife Navváb expressed an interest in her to marry ʻAbdu'l-Bahá. After a wearisome journey from Isfahán to Akka she finally arrived accompanied by her brother in 1872. The young couple were betrothed for about five months before the marriage itself commenced. In the meantime, Fátimih lived in the home of ʻAbdu'l-Bahá's uncle Mírzá Músá. According to her later memoirs, Fátimih fell in love with ʻAbdu'l-Bahá on seeing him. ʻAbdu'l-Bahá himself had showed little inkling to marriage until meeting Fátimih; who was entitled Munírih by Baháʼu'lláh. Munírih is a title meaning "Luminous".

The marriage resulted in nine children. The first born was a son Mihdí Effendi who died aged about 3. He was followed by Ḍíyáʼíyyih K͟hánum, Fuʼádíyyih K͟hánum (d. few years old), Rúhangíz Khánum (d. 1893), Túbá Khánum, Husayn Effendi (d.1887 aged 5), Túbá K͟hánum, Rúhá K͟hánum (mother of Munib Shahid), and Munnavar K͟hánum. The death of his children caused ʻAbdu'l-Bahá immense grief – in particular the death of his son Husayn Effendi came at a difficult time following the death of his mother and uncle. The surviving children (all daughters) were; Ḍíyáʼíyyih K͟hánum (mother of Shoghi Effendi) (d. 1951) Túbá K͟hánum (1880–1959) Rúḥá K͟hánum and Munavvar K͟hánum (d. 1971). Baháʼu'lláh wished that the Baháʼís follow the example of ʻAbdu'l-Bahá and gradually move away from polygamy. The marriage of ʻAbdu'l-Bahá to one woman and his choice to remain monogamous, from advice of his father and his own wish, legitimised the practice of monogamy to a people who hitherto had regarded polygamy as a righteous way of life.

Early years of his ministry

After Baháʼu'lláh died on 29 May 1892, the Will and Testament of Baháʼu'lláh named ʻAbdu'l-Bahá as Centre of the Covenant, successor and interpreter of Baháʼu'lláh's writings.

Baháʼu'lláh designates his successor with the following verses:

This translation of the Kitáb-i-ʻAhd is based on a solecism, however, as the terms Akbar and Aʻzam do not mean, respectively, 'Greater' and 'Most Great'. Not only do the two words derive from entirely separate triconsonantal roots (Akbar from k-b-r and Aʻzam from ʻ-z-m), but the Arabic language possesses the elative, a stage of gradation, with no clear distinction between the comparative and superlative. In the Will and Testament ʻAbdu'l-Bahá's half-brother, Muhammad ʻAlí, was mentioned by name as being subordinate to ʻAbdu'l-Bahá. Muhammad ʻAlí became jealous of his half-brother and set out to establish authority for himself as an alternative leader with the support of his brothers Badiʻu'llah and Ḍíyáʼu'llah. He began correspondence with Baháʼís in Iran, initially in secret, casting doubts in others' minds about ʻAbdu'l-Bahá. While most Baháʼís followed ʻAbdu'l-Bahá, a handful followed Muhammad ʻAlí including such leaders as Mirza Javad and Ibrahim George Kheiralla, an early Baháʼí missionary to America.

Muhammad ʻAlí and Mirza Javad began to openly accuse ʻAbdu'l-Bahá of taking on too much authority, suggesting that he believed himself to be a Manifestation of God, equal in status to Baháʼu'lláh. It was at this time that ʻAbdu'l-Bahá, to provide proof of the falsity of the accusations leveled against him, in tablets to the West, stated that he was to be known as "ʻAbdu'l-Bahá" an Arabic phrase meaning the Servant of Bahá to make it clear that he was not a Manifestation of God, and that his station was only servitude. ʻAbdu'l-Bahá left a Will and Testament that set up the framework of administration. The two highest institutions were the Universal House of Justice, and the Guardianship, for which he appointed Shoghi Effendi as the Guardian. With the exception of ʻAbdu'l-Bahá and Shoghi Effendi, Muhammad ʻAlí was supported by all of the remaining male relatives of Baháʼu'lláh, including Shoghi Effendi's father, Mírzá Hádí Shírází. However Muhammad ʻAlí's and his families statements had very little effect on the Baháʼís in general – in the ʻAkká area, the followers of Muhammad ʻAlí represented six families at most, they had no common religious activities, and were almost wholly assimilated into Muslim society.

First Western pilgrims 

By the end of 1898, Western pilgrims started coming to Akka on pilgrimage to visit ʻAbdu'l-Bahá; this group of pilgrims, including Phoebe Hearst, was the first time that Baháʼís raised up in the West had met ʻAbdu'l-Bahá. The first group arrived in 1898 and throughout late 1898 to early 1899 Western Baháʼís sporadically visited ʻAbdu'l-Bahá. The group was relatively young containing mainly women from high American society in their 20s. The group of Westerners aroused suspicion for the authorities, and consequently ʻAbdu'l-Bahá's confinement was tightened. During the next decade ʻAbdu'l-Bahá would be in constant communication with Baháʼís around the world, helping them to teach the religion; the group included May Ellis Bolles in Paris, Englishman Thomas Breakwell, American Herbert Hopper, French , Susan Moody, Lua Getsinger, and American Laura Clifford Barney. It was Laura Clifford Barney who, by asking questions of ʻAbdu'l-Bahá over many years and many visits to Haifa, compiled what later became the book Some Answered Questions.

Ministry, 1901–1912

During the final years of the 19th century, while ʻAbdu'l-Bahá was still officially a prisoner and confined to ʻAkka, he organized the transfer of the remains of the Báb from Iran to Palestine. He then organized the purchase of land on Mount Carmel that Baháʼu'lláh had instructed should be used to lay the remains of the Báb, and organized for the construction of the Shrine of the Báb. This process took another 10 years. With the increase of pilgrims visiting ʻAbdu'l-Bahá, Muhammad ʻAlí worked with the Ottoman authorities to re-introduce stricter terms on ʻAbdu'l-Bahá's imprisonment in August 1901. By 1902, however, due to the Governor of ʻAkka being supportive of ʻAbdu'l-Bahá, the situation was greatly eased; while pilgrims were able to once again visit ʻAbdu'l-Bahá, he was confined to the city. In February 1903, two followers of Muhammad ʻAlí, including Badiʻu'llah and Siyyid ʻAliy-i-Afnan, broke with Muhammad ʻAli and wrote books and letters giving details of Muhammad ʻAli's plots and noting that what was circulating about ʻAbdu'l-Bahá was fabrication.

From 1902 to 1904, in addition to the building of the Shrine of the Báb that ʻAbdu'l-Bahá was directing, he started to put into execution two different projects; the restoration of the House of the Báb in Shiraz, Iran and the construction of the first Baháʼí House of Worship in Ashgabat, Turkmenistan. ʻAbdu'l-Bahá asked Aqa Mirza Aqa to coordinate the work so that the house of the Báb would be restored to the state that it was at the time of the Báb's declaration to Mulla Husayn in 1844; he also entrusted the work on the House of Worship to Vakil-u'd-Dawlih.

During this period, ʻAbdu'l-Bahá communicated with a number of Young Turks, opposed to the reign of Sultan Abdul Hamid II, including Namık Kemal, Ziya Pasha and Midhat Pasha, in an attempt to disseminate Baháʼí thought into their political ideology. He emphasized Baháʼís "seek freedom and love liberty, hope for equality, are well-wishers of humanity and ready to sacrifice their lives to unite humanity" but on a more broad approach than the Young Turks. Abdullah Cevdet, one of the founders of the Committee of Union and Progress who considered the Baháʼí Faith an intermediary step between Islam and the ultimate abandonment of religious belief, would go on trial for defense of Baháʼís in a periodical he founded.

‛Abdu'l-Bahá also had contact with military leaders as well, including such individuals as Bursalı Mehmet Tahir Bey and Hasan Bedreddin. The latter, who was involved in the overthrow of Sultan Abdülaziz, is commonly known as Bedri Paşa or Bedri Pasha and is referred to in Persian Baháʼí sources as Bedri Bey (Badri Beg). He was a Baháʼí who translated ‛Abdu'l-Baha's works into French.

ʻAbdu'l-Bahá also met Muhammad Abduh, one of the key figures of Islamic Modernism and the Salafi movement, in Beirut, at a time when the two men were both opposed to the Ottoman ulama and shared similar goals of religious reform. Rashid Rida asserts that during his visits to Beirut, ʻAbdu'l-Bahá would attend Abduh's study sessions. Regarding the meetings of ʻAbdu'l-Bahá and Muhammad ʻAbduh, Shoghi Effendi asserts that "His several interviews with the well-known Shaykh Muhammad ʻAbdu served to enhance immensely the growing prestige of the community and spread abroad the fame of its most distinguished member."

Due to ʻAbdu'l-Bahá's political activities and alleged accusation against him by Muhammad ʻAli, a Commission of Inquiry interviewed ʻAbdu'l-Bahá in 1905, with the result that he was almost exiled to Fezzan. In response, ʻAbdu'l-Bahá wrote the sultan a letter protesting that his followers refrain from involvement in partisan politics and that his tariqa had guided many Americans to Islam. The next few years in ʻAkka were relatively free of pressures and pilgrims were able to come and visit ʻAbdu'l-Bahá. By 1909 the mausoleum of the Shrine of the Báb was completed.

Journeys to the West

The 1908 Young Turks revolution freed all political prisoners in the Ottoman Empire, and ʻAbdu'l-Bahá was freed from imprisonment. His first action after his freedom was to visit the Shrine of Baháʼu'lláh in Bahji. While ʻAbdu'l-Bahá continued to live in ʻAkka immediately following the revolution, he soon moved to live in Haifa near the Shrine of the Báb. In 1910, with the freedom to leave the country, he embarked on a three-year journey to Egypt, Europe, and North America, spreading the Baháʼí message.

From August to December 1911, ʻAbdu'l-Bahá visited cities in Europe, including London, Bristol, and Paris. The purpose of these trips was to support the Baháʼí communities in the west and to further spread his father's teachings.

In the following year, he undertook a much more extensive journey to the United States and Canada to once again spread his father's teachings. He arrived in New York City on 11 April 1912, after declining an offer of passage on the RMS Titanic, telling the Baháʼí believers, instead, to "Donate this to charity." He instead travelled on a slower craft, the RMS Cedric, and cited preference of a longer sea journey as the reason. After hearing of the Titanic's sinking on 16 April he was quoted as saying "I was asked to sail upon the Titanic, but my heart did not prompt me to do so." While he spent most of his time in New York, he visited Chicago, Cleveland, Pittsburgh, Washington, D.C., Boston and Philadelphia. In August of the same year he started a more extensive journey to places including New Hampshire, the Green Acre school in Maine, and Montreal (his only visit to Canada). He then travelled west to Minneapolis, San Francisco, Stanford, and Los Angeles before starting to return east at the end of October. On 5 December 1912 he set sail back to Europe.

During his visit to North America he visited many missions, churches, and groups, as well as having scores of meetings in Baháʼís' homes, and offering innumerable personal meetings with hundreds of people. During his talks he proclaimed Baháʼí principles such as the unity of God, unity of the religions, oneness of humanity, equality of women and men, world peace and economic justice. He also insisted that all his meetings be open to all races.

His visit and talks were the subject of hundreds of newspaper articles. In Boston newspaper reporters asked ʻAbdu'l-Bahá why he had come to America, and he stated that he had come to participate in conferences on peace and that just giving warning messages is not enough. ʻAbdu'l-Bahá's visit to Montreal provided notable newspaper coverage; on the night of his arrival the editor of the Montreal Daily Star met with him and that newspaper along with The Montreal Gazette, Montreal Standard, Le Devoir and La Presse among others reported on ʻAbdu'l-Bahá's activities. The headlines in those papers included "Persian Teacher to Preach Peace", "Racialism Wrong, Says Eastern Sage, Strife and War Caused by Religious and National Prejudices", and "Apostle of Peace Meets Socialists, Abdul Baha's Novel Scheme for Distribution of Surplus Wealth." The Montreal Standard, which was distributed across Canada, took so much interest that it republished the articles a week later; the Gazette published six articles and Montreal's largest French language newspaper published two articles about him. His 1912 visit to Montreal also inspired humourist Stephen Leacock to parody him in his bestselling 1914 book Arcadian Adventures with the Idle Rich. In Chicago one newspaper headline included "His Holiness Visits Us, Not Pius X but A. Baha," and ʻAbdu'l-Bahá's visit to California was reported in the Palo Altan.

Back in Europe, he visited London, Edinburgh, Paris (where he stayed for two months), Stuttgart, Budapest, and Vienna. Finally, on 12 June 1913, he returned to Egypt, where he stayed for six months before returning to Haifa.

On 23 February 1914, at the eve of World War I, ʻAbdu'l-Bahá hosted Baron Edmond James de Rothschild, a member of the Rothschild banking family who was a leading advocate and financier of the Zionist movement, during one of his early trips to Palestine.

Final years (1914–1921)

During World War I (1914–1918) ʻAbdu'l-Bahá stayed in Palestine and was unable to travel. He carried on a limited correspondence, which included the Tablets of the Divine Plan, a collection of 14 letters addressed to the Baháʼís of North America, later described as one of three "charters" of the Baháʼí Faith. The letters assign a leadership role for the North American Baháʼís in spreading the religion around the planet.

Haifa was under real threat of Allied bombardment, enough that ʻAbdu'l-Bahá and other Baháʼís temporarily retreated to the hills east of ʻAkka.

ʻAbdu'l-Bahá was also under threats from Cemal Paşa, the Ottoman military chief who at one point expressed his desire to crucify him and destroy Baháʼí properties in Palestine. The surprisingly swift Megiddo offensive of the British General Allenby swept away the Turkish forces in Palestine before harm was done to the Baháʼís, and the war was over less than two months later.

Post-war period

The conclusion of World War I led to the openly hostile Ottoman authorities being replaced by the more friendly British Mandate, allowing for a renewal of correspondence, pilgrims, and development of the Baháʼí World Centre properties. It was during this revival of activity that the Baháʼí Faith saw an expansion and consolidation in places like Egypt, the Caucasus, Iran, Turkmenistan, North America and South Asia under the leadership of ʻAbdu'l-Bahá.

The end of the war brought about several political developments that ʻAbdu'l-Bahá commented on. The League of Nations formed in January 1920, representing the first instance of collective security through a worldwide organization. ʻAbdu'l-Bahá had written in 1875 for the need to establish a "Union of the nations of the world", and he praised the attempt through the League of Nations as an important step towards the goal. He also said that it was "incapable of establishing Universal Peace" because it did not represent all nations and had only trivial power over its member states. Around the same time, the British Mandate supported the ongoing immigration of Jews to Palestine. ʻAbdu'l-Bahá mentioned the immigration as a fulfillment of prophecy, and encouraged the Zionists to develop the land and "elevate the country for all its inhabitants... They must not work to separate the Jews from the other Palestinians."

The war also left the region in famine. In 1901, ʻAbdu'l-Bahá had purchased about 1704 acres of scrubland near the Jordan river and by 1907 many Baháʼís from Iran had begun sharecropping on the land. ʻAbdu'l-Bahá received between 20 and 33% of their harvest (or cash equivalent), which was shipped to Haifa. With the war still raging in 1917, ʻAbdu'l-Bahá received a large amount of wheat from the crops, and also bought other available wheat and shipped it all back to Haifa. The wheat arrived just after the British captured Palestine, and as such was allowed to be widely distributed to allay the famine. For this service in averting a famine in Northern Palestine he received the honour of Knight Commander of the Order of the British Empire at a ceremony held in his honor at the home of the British Governor on 27 April 1920. He was later visited by General Allenby, King Faisal (later King of Iraq), Herbert Samuel (High Commissioner for Palestine), and Ronald Storrs (Military Governor of Jerusalem).

Death and funeral

ʻAbdu'l-Bahá died on Monday, 28 November 1921, sometime after 1:15 a.m. (27th of Rabi' al-awwal, 1340 AH).

Then Colonial Secretary Winston Churchill telegraphed the High Commissioner for Palestine, "convey to the Baháʼí Community, on behalf of His Majesty's Government, their sympathy and condolescence." Similar messages came from Viscount Allenby, the Council of Ministers of Iraq, and others.

On his funeral, which was held the next day, Esslemont notes:

Among the talks delivered at the funeral, Shoghi Effendi records Stewart Symes giving the following tribute:

He was buried in the front room of the Shrine of the Báb on Mount Carmel. His interment there is meant to be temporary, until his own mausoleum can be built in the vicinity of Riḍván Garden, known as the Shrine of ʻAbdu'l-Bahá.

Legacy

ʻAbdu'l-Bahá left a Will and Testament that was originally written between 1901 and 1908 and addressed to Shoghi Effendi, who at that time was only 4–11 years old. The will appoints Shoghi Effendi as the first in a line of Guardians of the religion, a hereditary executive role that may provide authoritative interpretations of scripture. ʻAbdu'l-Bahá directed all Baháʼís to turn to him and obey him, and assured him of divine protection and guidance. The will also provided a formal reiteration of his teachings, such as the instructions to teach, manifest spiritual qualities, associate with all people, and shun Covenant-breakers. Many obligations of the Universal House of Justice and the Hands of the Cause were also elaborated. Shoghi Effendi later described the document as one of three "charters" of the Baháʼí Faith.

The authenticity and provisions of the will were almost universally accepted by Baháʼís around the world, with the exception of Ruth White and a few other Americans who tried to protest Shoghi Effendi's leadership.

In volumes of The Baháʼí World published in 1930 and 1933, Shoghi Effendi named nineteen Baháʼís as disciples of ʻAbdu'l-Bahá and heralds of the Covenant, including Thornton Chase, John Esslemont, Lua Getsinger, and Robert Turner. No other statements about them have been found in Shoghi Effendi's writings.

During his lifetime there was some ambiguity among Baháʼís as to his station relative to Baháʼu'lláh, and later to Shoghi Effendi. Some American newspapers reported him to be a Baháʼí prophet or the return of Christ. Shoghi Effendi later formalized his legacy as the last of three "Central Figures" of the Baháʼí Faith and the "Perfect exemplar" of the teachings, also claiming that holding him on an equal status to Baháʼu'lláh or Jesus was heretical. Shoghi Effendi also wrote that during the anticipated Baháʼí dispensation of 1000 years there will be no equal to ʻAbdu'l-Bahá.

Appearance and personality 

ʻAbdu'l-Bahá was described as handsome, and bore striking resemblance to his mother. As an adult he reached medium height but he gave the impression of being taller. He had dark hair that flowed to his shoulders, grey coloured eyes, a fair complexion and an aquiline nose. In 1890, Orientalist Edward Granville Browne met him and wrote:

After the death of Bahá’u’lláh, ʻAbdu'l-Bahá began to visibly age. By the late 1890s his hair had turned snow-white and deep lines set on his face. As a young man he was athletic and enjoyed archery, horseback riding and swimming. Even later in his life ʻAbdu'l-Bahá remained active going for long walks in Haifa and Acre.

ʻAbdu'l-Bahá was a major presence for the Bahá’ís during his lifetime, and he continues to influence the Bahá’í community today. Bahá’ís regard ‘Abdu’l-Bahá as the perfect example of the teachings of his father and therefore strive to emulate him. Anecdotes about him are frequently used to illustrate particular points about morality and interpersonal relations. He was remembered for his charisma, compassion, philanthropy and strength in the face of suffering. John Esslemont reflected that "[‘Abdu’l-Bahá] showed that it is still possible, amid the whirl and rush of modern life, amid the self-love and struggle for material prosperity that everywhere prevail, to live the life of entire devotion to God and to the service of one's fellows."

Even ardent enemies of the Bahá’í Faith were on occasion taken by meeting him. Mírzá 'Abdu'l-Muḥammad Írání Mu'addibu's-Sulṭán, an Iranian, and Shaykh 'Alí Yúsuf, an Arab, were both newspaper editors in Egypt who had published harsh attacks on the Bahá’í Faith in their papers. They called on ‘Abdu’l-Bahá when he was in Egypt and their attitude changed. Similarly, a Christian clergyman, Rev. J.T. Bixby, who was the author of a hostile article on the Bahá’í Faith in the United States, felt compelled to witness Abdu'l-Bahá's personal qualities. The effect of ‘Abdu’l-Bahá on those who were already committed Bahá’ís was greater still.

ʻAbdu'l-Bahá was widely known for his encounters with the poor and dying. His generosity resulted in his own family complaining that they were left with nothing. He was sensitive to people’s feelings, and later expressed his wish to be a beloved figure of the Bahá’ís saying “I am your father...and you must be glad and rejoice, for I love you exceedingly.” According to historical accounts, he had a keen sense of humour and was relaxed and informal. He was open about personal tragedies such as the loss of his children and the sufferings he'd endured as a prisoner, further enhancing his popularity.

‘Abdu’l-Bahá directed the affairs of the Bahá’í community with care. He was inclined to allow a large range of personal interpretations of the Bahá’í teachings as long as these did not obviously contradict fundamental principles. He did, however, expel members of the religion he felt were challenging his leadership and deliberately causing disunity in the community. Outbreaks of persecution of the Bahá’ís affected him deeply. He wrote personally to the families of those who had been martyred.

Works

The total estimated number of tablets that ʻAbdu'l-Bahá wrote are over 27,000 of which only a fraction have been translated into English. His works fall into two groups including first his direct writings and second his lectures and speeches as noted by others. The first group includes The Secret of Divine Civilization written before 1875, A Traveller's Narrative written around 1886, the Resāla-ye sīāsīya or Sermon on the Art of Governance written in 1893, the Memorials of the Faithful, and a large number of tablets written to various people; including various Western intellectuals such as Auguste Forel which has been translated and published as the Tablet to Auguste-Henri Forel. The Secret of Divine Civilization and the Sermon on the Art of Governance were widely circulated anonymously.

The second group includes Some Answered Questions, which is an English translation of a series of table talks with Laura Barney, and Paris Talks, ʻAbdu'l-Baha in London and Promulgation of Universal Peace which are respectively addresses given by ʻAbdu'l-Bahá in Paris, London and the United States.

The following is a list of some of ʻAbdu'l-Bahá's many books, tablets, and talks:
Foundations of World Unity
 Light of the World: Selected Tablets of ‘Abdu’l-Bahá.
Memorials of the Faithful
Paris Talks
Secret of Divine Civilization
Some Answered Questions
Tablets of the Divine Plan
Tablet to Auguste-Henri Forel
Tablet to The Hague
Will and Testament of ʻAbdu'l-Bahá
Promulgation of Universal Peace
Selections from the Writings of ʻAbdu'l-Bahá
Divine Philosophy
Treatise on Politics / Sermon on the Art of Governance

See also

Baháʼu'lláh's family
Mírzá Mihdí
Ásíyih Khánum
Bahíyyih Khánum
Munirih Khánum
Shoghi Effendi
House of ʻAbdu'l-Bahá

Further reading

Explanatory notes

Notes

References

Further reading

External links

  Writings and Talks of ‘Abdu’l‑Bahá at Bahai.org
 
 Bahai org: Exemplar, documentary film (2021)
 The Extraordinary Life of 'Abdu'l-Bahá, by the Utterance Project

1844 births
1921 deaths
Bahá'í central figures
Family of Baháʼu'lláh
Burials at Monument Gardens, Haifa
Knights Commander of the Order of the British Empire
19th-century Iranian people
20th-century Iranian politicians
Iranian religious leaders
People from Nur, Iran
Iranian emigrants to the Ottoman Empire